Peesh ili luzhesh is a Bulgarian television mystery music game show based on South Korean programme I Can See Your Voice. It premiered on Nova on 3 November 2016.

Gameplay

Format
Presented with a group of eight "mystery singers" identified only by their occupation, a guest artist must attempt to eliminate bad singers from the group without ever hearing them sing, assisted by clues and a celebrity panel over the course of four rounds. At the end of the game, the last remaining mystery singer is revealed as either good or bad by means of a duet between them and one of the guest artists.

Rewards
If the singer is good, he/she will perform again in the post-season encore concert episode; if the singer is bad, he/she wins 3,000 leva.

Rounds
Each episode presents the guest artist with eight people whose identities and singing voices are kept concealed until they are eliminated to perform on the "stage of truth" or remain in the end to perform the final duet.

Production
Nova Broadcasting Group first announced the development of the series in August 2016. It is produced by Global Films; the staff team is managed by producer Magarditch Halvadjian and director Kiril Kirov.

Episodes

Guest artists

Panelists

New Year's Eve Concert (31 December 2016)
Aired on the last day of 2016, this episode includes an encore concert that featured winning mystery singers alongside guest artists returning to perform one last time. In the penultimate performance, Rosen Belov made his example of "bad singers turned good" scenario, thus it is the only ICSYV franchise to do so.

Notes

References

External links

International versions of I Can See Your Voice
2010s Bulgarian television series
2016 Bulgarian television series debuts
Bulgarian television series based on South Korean television series
Bulgarian-language television shows
Nova (Bulgarian TV channel) original programming